Australia vs France in rugby league is an international rugby league rivalry between the Australian Kangaroos and "Les Chanticleers," French national team. The first match between the two sides was in 1938 in Paris, with Australia running out 35–6 winners.

There have been 60 official test matches and Rugby League World Cup games played between the two countries since that first game in 1938 with Australia having won 44, France 14 while there have been 2 drawn games.

The record attendance for an Australia vs France test was set during France's 1951 tour when 67,009 attended the 3rd test of the series at the Sydney Cricket Ground. The 3-test 1951 series also attracted the record aggregate attendance for an Australia vs France series with 162,169 attending the games.

Head to Head

Results

2000s

1990s

1980s

1970s

1960s

1950s

1940s

1930s

References

External links

Rugby league rivalries
Rugby league
Australia national rugby league team
France national rugby league team
Sports rivalries in Australia
Sports rivalries in France